The 2002 Wyre Forest District Council election took place on 2 May 2002 to elect members of  Wyre Forest District Council in Worcestershire, England. One third of the council was up for election and the Independent Kidderminster Hospital and Health Concern party gained overall control of the council from no overall control.

After the election, the composition of the council was:
Health Concern 21
Conservative 6
Labour 5
Liberal 5
Liberal Democrats 2
Independent 2
Vacant 1

Campaign
Before the election the council was run by a coalition of Health Concern, Conservative, Liberal Democrats and Liberal councillors. 14 seats were initially expected to be contested with the Conservatives unopposed in Chaddesley ward. However, in mid April the defending Liberal Democrat councillor for Sutton Park, Steve Roberts, died meaning that the election in that ward was postponed until a by-election could be held. With Labour defending 6 of the seats which were being contested there was an expectation that the Health Concern group could gain a majority on the council. Since the last election in 2000, Richard Taylor from Health Concern had gained the parliamentary constituency from Labour in the 2001 general election.

The issue of the downgrading of the local Kidderminster hospital, which had dominated the last two council election, continued to remain a significant theme of the campaign. Another issue which was raised in the campaign was concern over plans to establish a new incinerator in Kidderminster, which was opposed by all the parties contesting the election.

Election result
The results saw the Health Concern party gain control of the council after making a net gain of five seats. This meant that Health Concern had 21 seats, 15 more than any other party. They thus had control of the council on the chairman's casting vote.

The gains for Health Concern were mainly at the expense of Labour who lost five seats, with the Liberal Democrats also losing a seat. However both the Conservative and Liberal parties gained one seat each. Overall turnout at the election was 32%.

Ward results

By-elections between 2002 and 2003
A by-election was held in Sutton Park on 13 June 2002 after the death of Liberal Democrat councillor Steve Roberts. The seat was gained for the Conservatives by Marcus Hart with a majority of 77 votes over Health Concern candidate Jennifer Harrison. This meant Health Concern no longer had a majority on the council, but continued to run the council with the casting vote of the council chairman, as they had 21 of the 42 seats on the council.

References

2002 English local elections
2002
2000s in Worcestershire